Patrick Sheltra (born May 14, 1986) is an American professional stock car racing driver and owner. Sheltra was the 2010 ARCA Racing Series season champion.

Personal life
Sheltra was born in Indiantown, Florida on May 14, 1986.

Career
Starting to race at local tracks in 2001, Sheltra moved up to the ARCA Re/MAX Series in 2005, starting his first race at Chicagoland Speedway. Running his first full season in the series in 2007, he ran the next three seasons of the series as well; a wreck in the season-opening event at Daytona International Speedway in 2009 resulted in his being briefly hospitalized.

Competing for the family-owned Sheltra Motorsports team, Sheltra ran his final full season of ARCA Racing Series competition in 2010, scoring two victories and 17 top-10 finishes on his way to winning the season title, his first national championship in the series. Driving the No. 60 Toyota, Sheltra won the championship by a 20-point margin over Craig Goess, becoming the first owner-driver to win the ARCA championship since Benny Parsons achieved the feat in 1969.

In addition to his career in ARCA, Sheltra ran a single NASCAR Craftsman Truck Series event in 2007, and made his debut in the NASCAR Nationwide Series in 2008, running five races in the series over the next three years. In 2011, Sheltra drove the No. 41 Ford for Rick Ware Racing in the season-opening DRIVE4COPD 300 at Daytona International Speedway. In addition, he assumed responsibility for the operation of the family race team, Sheltra Motorsports, which ran Venezuelan driver Milka Duno for the majority of the 2011 ARCA Racing Series season.

Motorsports career results

NASCAR
(key) (Bold – Pole position awarded by qualifying time. Italics – Pole position earned by points standings or practice time. * – Most laps led.)

Nationwide Series

Camping World Truck Series

ARCA Racing Series
(key) (Bold – Pole position awarded by qualifying time. Italics – Pole position earned by points standings or practice time. * – Most laps led.)

References

External links
 
 
 Patrick Sheltra at The Crittenden Automotive Library

Living people
1986 births
People from Indiantown, Florida
Racing drivers from Florida
NASCAR drivers
ARCA Menards Series drivers